Asota plaginota is a moth of the family Erebidae first described by Arthur Gardiner Butler in 1875. It is found in China, India, Indonesia, Myanmar, Malaysia, Nepal, Papua New Guinea, the Philippines, Sikkim, Singapore, Sri Lanka, Thailand and Vietnam. In Northeast India, it is recorded as a millet pest.

The wingspan is 61–65 mm.

Subspecies
Asota plaginota plaginota (China, India, Indonesia, Myanmar, Malaysia, Nepal, Papua New Guinea, Philippines, Sikkim, Sri Lanka, Thailand, Vietnam)
Asota plaginota stigmatica (Borneo, Java)
Asota plaginota strigivenata (China, India, Indonesia, Singapore)

References

Asota (moth)
Moths described in 1875
Moths of Asia
Insect pests of millets